Admiral Edward Henry Meggs Davis  (18 August 1846, in Galway – 6 October 1929) was a Royal Navy captain, then admiral, who served in the Pacific Islands.

He established the British protectorate on the Gilbert Islands while commanding HMS Royalist.

Under the command of Captain Edward H.M. Davis, Royalist conducted a survey in 1891–92, visiting: New Hebrides and New Caledonia (10 December 1889 to 18 June 1891); Territory of Papua and British Solomon Islands (18 June 1891 to 9 April 1892); and Gilbert Islands, Marshall Islands and Ellice Islands (14 April 1892 to 30 August 1892).

On 27 May 1892, Captain Davis proclaimed the Gilbert Islands to be a British Protectorate, and in 1894, he received the C.M.G. "for services connected with certain islands in the Western Pacific."

References

 "Admiral E. H. M. Davis" (Obituaries). The Times. Monday, 7 October 1929. Issue 45327, col B, p. 16.

1846 births
1929 deaths
Royal Navy officers
Royal Navy admirals